Jorge Roura (born 20 June 1946) is a Spanish luger. He competed in the men's singles event at the 1968 Winter Olympics.

References

1946 births
Living people
Spanish male lugers
Olympic lugers of Spain
Lugers at the 1968 Winter Olympics
Place of birth missing (living people)